Nesitaudjatakhet (Nesi-taudjat-akhet) was a  wife of Pharaoh  Sheshonk II and the mother of Prince Osorkon D. Nesitaudjatakhet and her son Osorkon are mentioned in papyrus Denon in Saint Petersburg.

References

Queens consort of the Twenty-second Dynasty of Egypt
9th-century BC Egyptian women